Marry Me may refer to:

Film and television
Marry Me (1925 film), an American comedy silent film
Marry Me (1932 film), a British film
Marry Me! (1949 film), a British film
Marry Me (2022 film), an American romantic comedy film
Marry Me (miniseries), a television miniseries starring Lucy Liu
Marry Me (American TV series), an American television series

Music 
Marry Me (album), a 2007 album by St. Vincent
Marry Me (Olly Murs album), 2022
Marry Me (soundtrack), for the 2022 film
"Marry Me" (Train song), 2010
"Marry Me" (Jason Derulo song), 2013
"Marry Me" (Krista Siegfrids song), 2013
"Marry Me" (Thomas Rhett song), 2017
"Marry Me", a song by Neil Diamond with Buffy Lawson from Tennessee Moon, 1996
"Marry Me", a song by No Doubt from Return of Saturn, 2000
"Marry Me", a song by Drive-By Truckers from Decoration Day
"Marry Me", a song by Yemi Alade from Mama Africa
 "Marry Me", by Betty Who from Betty

Other uses
Marry Me (novel), a novel by John Updike
Marry Me (short story collection), a short story collection by Dan Rhodes
Marry Me (webcomic), a webcomic by Bobby Crosby

See also
"Come Marry Me", a song by Miss Platnum (feat. Peter Fox) from Chefa
Marry Me a Little (disambiguation)
Marriage proposal, an event where one person asks for the other's hand in marriage
Will You Marry Me? (disambiguation)